The Ukrainian National Home, is located at 140-142 Second Avenue (between Ninth St. and St. Mark's Place) in Manhattan's East Village. The building, which currently operates as a restaurant known as the Ukrainian East Village Restaurant, dates back as far as 1830, and has served as a private home, YMCA location, and the Stuyvesant Casino.
UK rock band New Order played one of their first shows there on November 18, 1981.

References

Buildings and structures in Manhattan
East Village, Manhattan
Ukrainian-American culture in New York City
New Order (band)
Buildings and structures completed in 1830